Shooting sports in the 1990 Asian Games were held at Beijing Shooting Range, Beijing, China on September 25–30, 1990.

Medalists

Men

Women

Medal table

References 

 ISSF Results Overview
 New Straits Times, September 25–30, 1990

External links
Asian Shooting Federation

 
1990 Asian Games events
1990
Asian Games
1990 Asian Games